The Minaker River is a tributary of the Prophet River in the Canadian province of British Columbia. It is part of the Mackenzie River basin as the Prophet River flows into the Muskwa River which then joins the Fort Nelson River, a tributary of the Mackenzie River.

See also
List of British Columbia rivers

References

Rivers of British Columbia
Peace River Land District